"In My Cabana" is a song by Polish singer Margaret. It was written by Anderz Wrethov, Linnea Deb, Arash Labaf, and Robert Uhlmann. The song was released for digital download on 10 February 2018 by Extensive Music and Warner Music in various countries, and by Magic Records in Poland.

Margaret participated in Melodifestivalen 2018, Sweden's national selection for Eurovision Song Contest 2018, with "In My Cabana". She qualified for the final via Andra chansen ("Second chance" round), and finished in seventh place with 103 points. The single peaked at number three on the Polish Airplay Chart and at number eight on the Swedish Singles Chart.

Track listing

Charts

Weekly charts

Year-end charts

Release history

References

2018 singles
2018 songs
Margaret (singer) songs
Melodifestivalen songs of 2018
Songs written by Linnea Deb
Songs written by Robert Uhlmann (composer)
Songs written by Wrethov
Warner Music Group singles
Songs written by Arash (singer)